The 1989 Tour de France was the 76th edition of Tour de France, one of cycling's Grand Tours. The Tour began in Luxembourg on 1 July and finished on the Champs-Élysées in Paris on 23 July. The Tour organisation invited 22 teams to the Tour, with 9 cyclists each.

Teams

Qualified teams

 
 
 
 
 
 
 
 
 
 
 
 
 
 
 
 
 
 

Invited teams

Cyclists

By starting number

By team

By nationality
The 198 riders that competed in the 1989 Tour de France represented 20 different countries. Riders from eleven countries won stages during the race; Netherlands riders won the largest number of stages.

Notes

References

1989 Tour de France
1989